The Bridger Formation is a geologic formation in southwestern Wyoming. It preserves fossils dating back to the Ypresian Epoch of the Paleogene Period. The formation was named by American geologist Ferdinand Vandeveer Hayden for Fort Bridger, which had itself been named for mountain man Jim Bridger. The Bridger Wilderness covers much of the Bridger Formation's area.

History

Before colonization, the lands making up the Bridger Formation had been inhabited by the Apsáalooke, Bannock, Eastern Shoshone, Hinono'eino, Očhéthi Šakówiŋ, Só'taeo'o, Tsétsêhéstâhese, and Ute nations. European settlers began to settle the area around the Bridger Formation in the 19th century, beginning with the establishment of the Oregon Trail in 1830. Fort Bridger – for which the formation would later be named – was established in 1843 by Jim Bridger and Louis Vasquez. In 1868, the remaining Indigenous communities in the area were displaced by the Treaty of Fort Bridger, removing them to the Fort Hall Indian Reservation and Wind River Indian Reservation.

The first documented fossils to be recovered from the Bridger Formation were discovered on 11 August 1849 by Captain Howard Stansbury, who documented the discovery of fossilized shells and wood in his expedition report while scouting out the region for the United States Army Corps of Topographical Engineers. In the early-1860s, trapper Jack Robinson claimed to have discovered a number of sites along the base of the Uinta Mountains where grizzly bears had been turned to stone. When these claims were called into question by judge William A. Carter, Robinson brought Carter a bag filled with the fossils. One of the specimens recovered by Robinson was a well-preserved skull which resembled that of a grizzly bear. Judger Carter invited Louis Agassiz to observe the local strata, but Agassiz declined as the journey would have involved riding horseback to the site, a mode of transportation Agassiz abhorred. Carter's son-in-law, Dr. J. Van A. Carter, would go on to send a number of fossils to palaeontologist Joseph Leidy at the University of Pennsylvania in 1869. These fossils included the first Bridgerian fossil taxa, Omomys carteri; and the skull discovered by Robinson, which was described as Palaeosyops paludosus. Another researcher responsible for sending off specimens was Dr. Joseph K. Corson, a close friend of Leidy's who hosted him and his family on two three to Fort Bridger in 1872, 1873, and 1879.

The Bridger Formation was described and named in 1869 by H.V. Hayden while conducting a geological survey in the region on behalf of the United States Geological and Geographical Survey of the Territories. The famously fossiliferous Bridger Formation attracted a number of famed palaeontologists including Henry Fairfield Osborn, William Berryman Scott, and F. Speir, Jr. The Bridger Formation also became a battleground in the Bone Wars between Edward Drinker Cope and Othniel Charles Marsh.

The Bridger Formation did not see a proper scientific mission until 1903, when Walter W. Granger and William Diller Matthew initiated a three-year survey of the strata, during which time Matthew identified the Bridger Formation's distinct members by using local limestone layers as marker beds. Later expeditions brought other researchers to the region, including Charles Lewis Gazin.

Geology
The Bridger Formation overlies the Green River Formation and underlies the Bishop Conglomerate. The boundary with the former occurs in the mid-Eocene after the region completed a transition to a drier environment from a moist climate in the early Eocene. Limestone deposits like the Sage Creek Formation separate the three distinct members which make up the Bridger Formation: Blacks Fork (Bridger B),  Twin Buttes (Bridger C & D), and Turtle Bluff (Bridger E). The limestone surrounding the Bridger Formation was deposited on the beds of lakes and ponds at the site during the Eocene. William Diller Matthew used this limestone as marker beds in his initial description of the Bridger Formation in 1909.

Portions formerly considered to be part of the Bridger Formation have since been reassigned to the nearby Uinta Formation.

Palaeobiology
Dozens of Early Eocene (50.3 - 46.2 Ma) mammalian and invertebrate genera are known from the Bridger Formation.

Eutherians

Artiodactyls

Achaenodontidae

Homacodontidae

Carnivoramorphans

stem Carnivoramophans

Miacidae

Viverravidae

Carnivorans

Cimolestans

Apatemyidae

Esthonychidae

Pantolestidae

Creodontans

Hyaenodontidae

Oxyaenidae

Dinoceratans

Eulipotyphlans

Erinaceomorpha

Geolabididae

Nyctitheriidae

Leptictidans

Macroscelids

Mesonychids

Perissodactyls

Amynodontidae

Brontotheriidae

Equidae

Hyopsodontidae

Hyrachyidae

Hyracodontidae

Isectolophidae

Tapiroidea

Palaeanodonta

Pholidotans

Plesiadapiformes

Primates

Microsyopidae

Notharctidae

Omomyidae

Rodentia

Cylindrodontidae

Ischyromyidae

Paramyidae

Reithroparamyidae

Sciuravidae

Metatherians

Herpetotheriidae

Peradectidae

Birds

Gruiformes

Strigiformes

Fish

Amiidae

Ariidae

Lepisosteidae

Osteoglossidae

Reptiles

Crocodilia

Squamates

Anguidae

Boidae

Chamaeleonidae

Rhineuridae

Teiidae

Varanidae

Testudines

Baenidae

Carettochelyidae

Dermatemydidae

Emydidae

Geoemydidae

Testudinidae

Trionychidae

Incertae sedis

See also

 List of fossiliferous stratigraphic units in Wyoming
 Paleontology in Wyoming

References

Paleogene geology of Wyoming
 
Lutetian Stage